The Swedish State Railways or SJ, originally the Royal Railway Board, was the former government agency responsible for operating the state-owned railways in Sweden.

It was created in 1887 as an agency belonging to the Ministry for Civil Service Affairs, with the task of managing all state-owned railway lines in Sweden, and was transferred to the Ministry of Communications in 1920.

In 1988, the rail tracks themselves were transferred to the Swedish Rail Administration, and in the upcoming years parts of SJ were gradually transformed into limited companies as a result of the open access obligation introduced by EU Directive 91/440. SJ was disbanded in 2001, with the assets transferred to seven separate companies, the first three owned by the Swedish government and the latter four being privatized:
SJ AB, usually called SJ, the passenger train operator
Green Cargo, which operates freight trains
Jernhusen, real estate
EuroMaint, currently a part of CAF, train maintenance
Unigrid, information technology
TraffiCare, which provides terminal services, e.g. train cleaning and switching
TrainTech Engineering, currently a part of SNC-Lavalin Rail & Transit, the technical unit.

Some of them have been sold to other companies, but SJ AB, Green Cargo and Jernhusen are still fully government owned (as of ).
Apart from these companies, Statens Järnvägar after 2001 continued to exist as a governmental agency, mainly dealing with the leasing of rail vehicles, but otherwise had no regular railroad activities. It was dismantled at the end of 2012 when that role was fully taken over by Trafikverket.

External links

Defunct railway companies of Sweden
Railway companies established in 1887
Railway companies disestablished in 2001
Government agencies established in 1887
Government agencies disestablished in 2001
Government-owned railway companies
Swedish companies established in 1887
Swedish companies disestablished in 2001